Pottassery-I is a village in the Palakkad district, state of Kerala, India. It forms a part of the Kanjirappuzha for administrative purposes.

Demographics
 India census, Pottassery-I had a population of 17,100 with 8,273 males and 8,827 females.

References

Villages in Kozhikode district
Kozhikode east